These hits topped the Dutch Top 40 in 1997 (see 1997 in music).

See also
1997 in music

1997 in the Netherlands
1997 record charts
1997